Yi Gwal (1587 – 15 February, 1624) was a general during the Joseon Dynasty, Korea, known for the failed Yi Gwal's Rebellion. His family belonged to the Gosung Yi clan. 

He rebelled against King Injo in 1624, but failed. Yi Gwal was then killed by his own troops. Yi Gwal's rebellion put Korea into a state of chaos before it was invaded by the Manchu Qing dynasty.

Background
In 1622, he joined the Injo revolution, which was a movement in Korea to get rid of the government of King Gwanghaegun, who advocated evenhanded diplomacy between the Ming and the Qing. At that time, the Han Ming Dynasty had recently fallen to the invading Jurchen, who had renamed themselves the Manchu. Historically, Korea was in a long time conflict with the Jurchen tribes, who inhabited the wide plains of Manchuria. The Jurchen took Liaoning during the late Ming and established the Later Jin dynasty.

Yi Gwal captured the capital of Hanyang and exile Gwanghaegun. However, he was rewarded only as a second class helper and neglected by the King.

As the relations with Later Jin deteriorated, the Korean government and Injo sent Yi Gwal to the border of Pyongan Province to ward off invasions from the Jin. There, Yi strengthened the walls and fortresses around the border and maintained strict military order.

Out of the fifteen thousand troops stationed in the northern border, Yi Gwal had command of ten thousand, stationed in Yongbyon while the five thousand stayed with General Jang Man (张晚) in Pyongyang.

Yi Gwal's Rebellion

Korea's political stance at the time caused the downfall of Yi Gwal. Since the establishment of a Confucian dynasty by King Taejo, there had been political disputes between the parties in the government. Some disputes even ended up in bloodshed, like the one which occurred in the time of King Yeonsangun. Also, during the time of King Seonjo just before the Japanese invasions of Korea, the political parties had been divided between East and West. The Eastern Party gradually split up into two parties called the Northern and Southern Parties.

In January 1624, the Western Party, recently unsatisfied with the success of Yi Gwal (who was part of the Northern Party), made a petition to the King stating that Yi Gwal and some members of the Northern Party were planning a rebellion. As these ministers all had a close relationship with the King, the petition was examined. However, the reports proved false, and the Western Party failed to condemn Yi Gwal. They tried again soon after, which provoked the suspicion of the King.

The government soon sent an examination and arrest party to Yongbyon to arrest Yi Gwal's son Yi Jeon. As he suspected that he himself would be condemned if his son confessed, he decided on a pre-emptive strike. Finally, he killed the arrest party and the rebellion officially began on January 22, 1624. He and his ten thousand troops headed straight for Hanyang, to relieve the capital and capture the King. 

The first clash with the government troops happened on the Hamgyong province, where the government troops were being led by Jeong Chung-sin and Nam Yi-hong. He tried to avoid these two generals and surpassed their troops. During the march to the capital, Yi Gwal met much opposition, but all were defeated. Injo soon abandoned the capital and Yi Gwal captured it on February 10. Since the establishment of the Joseon Dynasty, it was the first time a rebel army had captured the capital.

Yi Gwal then put Heungangun on the throne, a royal relative of the King. Moreover, he put fliers all over the city so the people would support his troops. However, the rebel occupation of the capital did not last long. 

The Hanseong was soon threatened by Jang Man and other generals from the government forces. Yi Gwal sent Han Myeong-ryun to combat the enemy, but the rebels were defeated due to inferior geographical position. By this time, Yi Gwal tried to escape the capital as the rebel army had disbanded and separated. As Yi Gwal and Han Myeong-ryun tried to escape on February 15, they were murdered by their own troops led by Gi Ik-heon, who were seeking forgiveness from the government.

Yi Gwal failed, but Joseon society effectively entered a period of chaos, which then provoked and facilitated the First Manchu invasion of Korea in 1627. Eventually Joseon would fall and become a vassal to the Qing dynasty.

See also
History of Korea
Manchu invasion of Korea

Joseon dynasty
1587 births
1624 deaths
Goseong Lee clan